The Common Sense series included thirteen political books published by Victor Gollancz Ltd in the United Kingdom during the early 1960s. They were intended to provide a general objective background on a particular topic and were addressed at the general reader who did not have specialised knowledge of the field. They were generally well received.

Books in series

Notes

Series of books
Political books